The Arnoldus Vander Horst House is a plantation house on Kiawah Island, South Carolina. It is named for Arnoldus Vanderhorst, who was a governor of South Carolina.

The house was listed in the National Register of Historic Places on October 25, 1973.

See also
Vanderhorst Row
Elias Vanderhorst House

References

Houses on the National Register of Historic Places in South Carolina
Houses completed in 1802
National Register of Historic Places in Charleston County, South Carolina
Houses in Charleston County, South Carolina